The Battle of Ciołków (the village is now called Ciółkowo; north-east of Płock) of 22 January 1863, was the first skirmish of the January Uprising. Fought between an unorganised Polish troop of ca. 100 men under Aleksander Rogaliński and a company of the Russian Murom Regiment under Col. Kozlaninov, the skirmish resulted in Polish victory.

As the engagement started on the very first day of the uprising, the Russian force still obeyed the orders of marching through the occupied country with their rifles unloaded. When the Russians approached a local manor in which the Poles had their quarters, the Russian commander ordered a loose formation and tried to negotiate an agreement and take all Poles into captivity. However, Rogaliński refused to negotiate and ordered a charge of the Russians. After a short hand-to-hand fight (the Polish unit had only two pieces of firearms and was mostly equipped with sabres, war scythes and improvised weapons), the Russian commander was killed and his unit dispersed. Polish losses were negligible, but the Polish commander was wounded and lost his eye.

References
  Józef Piłsudski (1913): 22 stycznia 1863. Poznań: Karol Rzepecki. pp. 13–14

Conflicts in 1863
Battles of the January Uprising
January 1863 events
History of Masovian Voivodeship
Płock Governorate